Davis County is or was the name of the following counties in the United States:

Davis County, Iowa, named in honor of Garrett Davis, a Congressman from Kentucky
Davis County, Utah, named for Daniel C. Davis, captain in the Mormon Battalion
Cass County, Texas, named Davis County from 1861 to 1871

Davis County may also refer to:

Jeff Davis County, Texas
Jeff Davis County, Georgia
Jefferson Davis Parish, Louisiana
Jefferson Davis County, Mississippi

See also
Daviess County, Kentucky, pronounced as "Davis"